Kathleen Kay Treseder is an American ecologist who specializes in the interplay between global climate change and fungal ecology. She also serves as a member of the Irvine City Council after being elected to the position in 2022. She is currently a professor in the Department of Ecology and Evolutionary Biology at the University of California, Irvine. She is a Fellow of the American Association for the Advancement of Science, the American Academy of Microbiology, and the Ecological Society of America.

As an undergraduate she co-authored a research paper that was published in Nature and was featured on the cover of the issue. Since then, Treseder has published over 90 peer-reviewed scientific papers that have been cited over 19,000 times.

Education and academic appointments 
Treseder graduated from the University of Utah in 1994 with an Honors Bachelors of Science in biology with a minor in chemistry. She obtained her Ph.D. in biological sciences from Stanford University in 1999, her dissertation title was “Plant-soil interactions across a fertility gradient in Hawaii : nutrient acquisition strategies and effects of genetic variation on ecosystem function” and her primary advisor was Peter Morrison Vitousek. She was a postdoctoral fellow at the University of California, Riverside, from 1999 to 2000.  She was an assistant professor in the Department of Biology at the University of Pennsylvania from 2001 to 2003, before moving to the Department of Ecology and Evolutionary Biology at the University of California, Irvine in 2003.  She became an associate professor in 2006, and a full professor in 2011.

Activism work 
Treseder was an integral part of the initial anti-sexual harassment initiative in UC Irvine and continues to be a strong proponent for gender equality and safe working spaces in STEM, often using #STEMtoo on social media platforms.

Beginning in November 2017, Treseder along with 3 other identified members of the School of Biology, Jessica Pratt, Benedicte Shipley, and Michelle Herrera, filed official complaints of sexual harassment against Francisco Ayala, an evolutionary biologist, eventually leading to Ayala’s termination with the university.

Other honors and awards 
Treseder was a Chancellor's Fellow at the University of California, Irvine from 2012 to 2015.  In 2015, she was chosen as a United States Representative for the publication "Young Women Scientists: A Bright Future for the Americas", 2015, InterAmerica Network of Academies of Sciences

References

External links 

 Treseder laboratory website
 Faculty page

Year of birth missing (living people)
Living people
American ecologists
University of Utah alumni
Stanford University alumni
University of Pennsylvania faculty
University of California, Irvine faculty
Fellows of the Ecological Society of America
Women ecologists